The Nisqually  is a Lushootseed-speaking Native American tribe in western Washington state in the United States. They are a Southern Coast Salish people. They are federally recognized as the Nisqually Indian Tribe, formerly known as the Nisqually Indian Tribe of the Nisqually Reservation and the Confederated Tribes of the Chehalis Reservation.

The tribe lives on a reservation in the Nisqually River valley near the river delta. In the 2000 census, it had a resident population of 588 persons, all in the Thurston County portion, on the southwest side of the Nisqually River.

The tribe moved onto their reservation east of Olympia, Washington, in late 1854 with the signing of the Medicine Creek Treaty. As reaction to the unfairness of the treaty, many members of the tribe led by Chief Leschi engaged and were eventually defeated by the US Army in the conflict known as the Puget Sound War in 1855–56.

Government

On September 9, 1946, the tribe's constitution and bylaws were approved. The constitution was amended in 1994. The governing body of the Tribe is the General Council comprising all enrolled tribal members 18 years of age or older. The day-to-day business and economic affairs of the tribe are overseen by a tribal council composed of seven tribal members elected by the tribe’s voting membership.

Language
The Nisqually is a subdialect of the southern dialect of Lushootseed named Twalshootseed, which belongs to the Salishan family. The Nisqually call themselves the Squalli-Absch / 'Susqually'absh (sq̓ʷaliʼabš), which means "people of the grass" or "People of the Grass Country" in Twalshootseed.

Country
The Nisqually Indians originally inhabited the interior woodlands and coastal waters from Mount Rainier west to Puget Sound. The lifestyle of the Nisqually, like many other Northwest Coastal tribes, revolved around fishing for salmon. In 1917, Pierce County, through the process of condemnation proceedings (eminent domain), took 3,370 acres (14 km²) for the Fort Lewis Military Reserve.

When building Ft. Lewis in 1917, the United States government wanted to control land for the project that rightfully belonged to the Nisqually people. The War Department negotiated a price of $25 per acre to be paid to the natives for the land the U.S. deemed necessary for the fort. The Nisqually people had neither the opportunity nor the funds to fight the government’s acquisition of their lands. When the war ended in 1918, the Nisqually people petitioned for their land to be returned to them, as the fort no longer needed to train troops for the war. The request was denied by Newton Baker, President Wilson’s Secretary of War. Cannon and artillery fire from the fort could be heard from the Nisqually reservation for the better part of the next century.

History

The Nisqually people have lived in the watershed for thousands of years. According to legend, the Squalli-absch (ancestors of the modern Nisqually Indian Tribe), came north from the Great Basin, crossed the Cascade Mountain Range and erected their first village in a basin now known as Skate Creek, just outside the Nisqually River Watershed's southern boundary. Later, a major village would be located near the Mashel River.

The Nisqually have always been a fishing people. The salmon has not only been the mainstay of their diet, but the foundation of their culture as well. The Nisqually Tribe is the prime steward of the Nisqually River fisheries resources, and operate two fish hatcheries: one on Clear Creek and one on Kalama Creek.

As of the year 2005, the tribe had a service area population of 5,719 Native Americans, 600 of whom reside on the reservation. An additional 5,119 service population members live off the reservation in Thurston and Pierce Counties. Tribal land holdings, on and near the Nisqually reservation, exceed 1,000 acres (4 km²)—all of which has been reacquired since 1986.

The original reservation was established by the Medicine Creek Treaty of December 26, 1854. The reservation consisted of 1,280 acres (5.2 km²) on Puget Sound. On January 20, 1856, an executive order enlarged it to 4,717 acres (19.1 km²) on both sides of the Nisqually River.

On September 30, 1884, land was set aside and divided into one-family allotments on both sides of the Nisqually River. The land did not include the river. The people lived in peace for a while harvesting fish from the river and growing potatoes on the prairie tracts.

They also received few government rations. In the winter of 1917, the U.S. Army moved onto Nisqually lands and ordered them from their homes without any warning. Later, the Army reallocated 3,353 acres (13.6 km²) of their land to expand the Fort Lewis base.

Interactions Between European Settlers and the Nisqually People
In the 1840s European settlers began to migrate into Nisqually territory. The numbers of settlers gradually grew and the 
Nisqually people were originally peaceful with the settlers until the actions of territorial governor Isaac Stevens in 1853. Stevens terminated Indian land rights and took millions of acres from native peoples and attempted to establish the Treaty of Medicine Creek with Chief Leschi of the Nisqually people. The treaty proposed was declined by Leschi due to the small amounts of land they would receive from it as well as the treaty requiring the Nisqually people to move away from Medicine creek to less livable and isolated shrubland. It is firmly believed by many that Stevens’ laws and actions in the war heavily influenced the retaliation of the Nisqually natives in the Puget Sound Indian war due to his mistreatment of the Native Nisqually and the middling and unsurvivable land he assigned them. After the Puget Sound Indian War had ceased, the native Nisqually tribesmen were assigned a new reservation back alongside the river but survival was still difficult due to the restricted sizes of their reservations as well as the U.S. military’s confiscation of 3,000 acres of their land for the creation of the Fort Lewis Military Reserve. Many Natives began to leave the reserves in search of better opportunities and homes elsewhere and from the beginning of the 20th century until the 1940s the US government controlled the education of Nisqually youth in attempts to assimilate them into white American culture.

Cuisine
Fish, both fresh and smoked, is an important staple in Nisqually cuisine, especially salmon, but also cod, eulachon, halibut, herring, sturgeon, and trout. Shellfish, deer, elk, and sea mammals were traditionally hunted for food. Camas, wild berries, crab apples, and other wild plants are traditionally gathered.

Notable Nisqually
 Billy Frank, Jr. (1931–2014), environmental leader and treaty rights activist 
 Chief Leschi (1808–1858), chief

Notes

References
 Pritzker, Barry M. A Native American Encyclopedia: History, Culture, and Peoples. Oxford: Oxford University Press, 2000.

External links

 Nisqually Indian Tribe, official website
 Chehalis Tribe, official website
 Nisqually Indian Tribe
  Billy Frank's obituary

 
Native American tribes in Washington (state)
Indigenous people of the Pacific Northwest